"Keep On Tryin'" is a song recorded by the Dutch band Twenty 4 Seven. It is their final single to feature Nancy Coolen and Stay-C, and the second single from their album, I Wanna Show You. The song was primarily successful in Benelux, where the single reached 29 on the Dutch singles chart, as well as number 32 in Belgium. But did not chart in the United Kingdom. "Keep On Tryin'" was the last single to feature Nance Coolen as the vocalist, and a studio video was not filmed for the track.

Charts

References

1995 singles
1995 songs
Twenty 4 Seven songs
CNR Music singles
ZYX Music singles
Songs written by Ruud van Rijen